The 2011–12 Portland Pilots men's basketball team represented the University of Portland in the 2011–12 NCAA Division I men's basketball season. The Pilots, members of the West Coast Conference, were led by sixth-year head coach Eric Reveno. They played their home games at the Chiles Center. They finished the season 7–24, 3–13 in WCC play to finish in eighth place and lost in the second round of the West Coast Conference tournament to San Francisco.

Departures
The Portland Pilots lost Luke Sikma and Jared Stohl because they both graduated from the University of Portland. They were both averaging over 10 points per game.

Roster

2011–12 Schedule and results

|-
!colspan=9| Exhibition

|-
!colspan=9| Regular season

|-
!colspan=9| West Coast Conference tournament

References

Portland
Portland Pilots men's basketball seasons
Port
Port